Tyler Harper (born April 19, 1986) is an American politician who serves as the Agriculture Commissioner of Georgia since 2023. He previously served in the Georgia State Senate representing the 7th district from 2013 to 2023. While in the Senate, he served as Chairman of the Natural Resources and the Environment Committee and Vice Chairman of the Public Safety Committee. He was also a member of the Appropriations Committee and Agriculture and Consumer Affairs Committee. A Native of Ocilla, GA, Harper is a 7th generation South Georgia farmer who runs a peanut, cotton, beef cattle, and timber operation on the same land his family has farmed for over 125 years.

Agriculture Commissioner Campaign 
On June 29, 2021, Harper announced his campaign for Georgia Commissioner of Agriculture. On May 24, 2022, Harper won the Republican Primary for State Agriculture Commissioner in which he was running unopposed. Harper won against a Democrat, a Libertarian, and an Independent in the November 8, 2022 General Election.

References 

 

1986 births
21st-century American politicians
Georgia (U.S. state) Commissioners of Agriculture
Republican Party Georgia (U.S. state) state senators
Living people
People from Ocilla, Georgia